Leuchtenberg is a municipality in the district of Neustadt an der Waldnaab in Bavaria, Germany, essentially a suburb of nearby Weiden in der Oberpfalz, and a larger historical region in the Holy Roman Empire governed by the Landgraves of Leuchtenberg.

Royal (noble) and notable (not noble) Leuchtenbergers 
Landgraves of Leuchtenberg
Thomas Mohr, Wisconsin farmer and local official

See also
 Duke of Leuchtenberg

References

Neustadt an der Waldnaab (district)
Bavarian Circle